Reflections from the Firepool is the third studio album by American rock band Djam Karet.

Release and reception
Allmusic reviewer François Couture preferred the band's later releases, noting that here "their assembling is a bit more crude." Despite this he praised the band for being at the top of their form, admitting that "all the elements that would constitute the band's sound for the next ten years are present." Glenn Astarita of All About Jazz shared much of the same criticisms, while noting that "the band goes for the jugular as they pursue impacting motifs amid heated interplay and cunning developments, in a loud yet purposeful sort of way."

In 2000, Cuneiform Records adopted and re-issued Reflections from the Firepool with an alternate cover.

Track listing

Personnel
Adapted from Reflections from the Firepool liner notes.

Djam Karet
Gayle Ellett – electric guitar, steel guitar, classical guitar, keyboards, tape, percussion
Mike Henderson – electric guitar, acoustic guitar, twelve-string guitars, percussion
Chuck Oken – drums, synthesizer, electronic drums, programming, engineering, mixing
Henry J. Osborne – bass guitar, keyboards, percussion

Additional musicians
Maxim J. Mahoney – saxophone
Production and additional personnel
Rychard Cooper – production, engineering, mixing, goblet drum (2)
Rob DeChaine – mixing
Djam Karet – production
Dave Druse – illustration, design

Release history

References

External links
 
 Reflections from the Firepool at Bandcamp

1989 albums
Cuneiform Records albums
Djam Karet albums